The 1967 World Netball Championships was the second edition of the INF Netball World Cup, a quadrennial international netball competition. The 1967 tournament was held in Perth, Western Australia, and featured eight teams. New Zealand were the winners.

Results

Table

Matches

Medallists

References

Netball 1967
Netball World Cup
World Netball Championships
Netball Championships
Sports competitions in Perth, Western Australia
1960s in Perth, Western Australia
August 1967 sports events in Australia
Netball in Western Australia